Teschner is a German surname. Notable people with the surname include:

 Gustav Wilhelm Teschner (1800–1883), German composer
 Mark Teschner, American casting director
 Melchior Teschner (1584–1635), German cantor, composer and theologian
 Peter Teschner, American film editor
 Rudolf Teschner (1922–2006), German chess master and writer

German-language surnames